The 2006 Pan American Fencing Championships were held in Valencia, Venezuela from 26 June to 28 June 2006. The only team events were in men's and women's foil.

Medal summary

Men's events

Women's events

Medal table

References
 2006 Annual Report of the International Fencing Federation

2006
Pan American Fencing Championships
International fencing competitions hosted by Venezuela
2006 in Venezuelan sport